Růžena Košťálová (21 February 1924 – January 2013) was a Czechoslovak sprint canoeist who competed in the late 1940s. She won a silver medal in the K-2 500 m event at the 1948 ICF Canoe Sprint World Championships in London.

Košťálová moved to Switzerland in 1968, where she died in January 2013, at the age of 88.

References

Sources

Růžena Košťálová's profile at Sports Reference.com

1924 births
2013 deaths
Canoeists at the 1948 Summer Olympics
Czech female canoeists
Czechoslovak female canoeists
ICF Canoe Sprint World Championships medalists in kayak
Olympic canoeists of Czechoslovakia